Ewen Thomas Jones (born 7 March 1960) is a former Australian politician representing the division of Herbert for the Liberal National Party from the 2010 federal election until the 2016 federal election.

Jones won the division of Herbert in 2010, achieving a 2.05% swing against the Labor candidate, former Mayor of Townsville, Tony Mooney. Jones is a longtime resident of Townsville, Queensland. He was Liberal Whip from 12 October 2015 until 9 May 2016.

On 18 July 2016, at the conclusion of vote counting for the 2016 election, Labor's Cathy O'Toole appeared to have defeated Jones by 8 votes, triggering an automatic recount. The recount and subsequent distribution of preferences gave O'Toole a margin of 37 votes. It represented the first time that Labor had won Herbert since the 1993 federal election.

References

External links
 
 

1960 births
Living people
Australian monarchists
Liberal National Party of Queensland members of the Parliament of Australia
Members of the Australian House of Representatives
Members of the Australian House of Representatives for Herbert
People from Townsville
Turnbull Government
21st-century Australian politicians